The Diana Fountain may refer to:

 The Diana, Princess of Wales Memorial Fountain, in Hyde Park, London, England
 The Diana Fountain, Bushy Park, in Bushy Park, London, England
 The Diana Fountain, Green Park, in Green Park, London, England
 The Huntress Diana Fountain, in Mexico City, Mexico

See also
 Fountain of Diana